New Lambton is a suburb of Newcastle, in the Hunter Region of New South Wales, Australia. It includes two shopping districts, schools and other general facilities. At the 2016 Australian census it had a population of approximately 10,000.

Initially a coal mining township, New Lambton later became a municipality until it was eventually incorporated into Greater Newcastle. The suburb, which is primarily residential, includes a  nature reserve and a major regional sports centre.

Geography 
While mainly residential in nature, the entire south-western part of the suburb is occupied by Blackbutt Reserve, a  nature reserve consisting primarily of natural bushland.

History

Early years 
New Lambton was originally a coal mining township, with the New Lambton Colliery situated to the east across the railway in what is now Adamstown.

On 8 January 1889 New Lambton was incorporated as a municipality covering .

1901 
In 1901 New Lambton had a population of 1,464. The municipal council consisted of the following:
 Mayor – George Errington
 Justice of the Peace
 Town Clerk – Henry J. Noble
 Aldermen – John Williams, Benjamin Bradley, John Butterworth, Charles Dagwell, Richard Lay, Michael Gray, J.P., Joseph Cartright and Alexander Sneddon.

The council derived a considerable revenue from the district's largest mine, the Scottish-Australian Coal Mining Company's Lambton Colliery, managed by the three Croudace brothers, Frank, Thomas, & Sydney, which although closer to Lambton fell within the New Lambton municipality. One of the district's principal thoroughfares today is Croudace Street.

The town was free of debt, and had a telegraph office, council chambers (erected at a cost of £550), the New Lambton Mechanics Institute, a reading room, fire brigade, public school, and "many signs of advancement". The Member for Kahibah in the New South Wales Legislative Assembly, including New Lambton, was Alfred Edden.

Later years 
In 1938 an act of the Parliament of New South Wales created the "City of Greater Newcastle", which incorporated eleven municipalities, including New Lambton, into one local government area.

During World War II, New Lambton Public School was requisitioned by the government and used as No. 2 Fighter Sector Headquarters. In recognition of this, the school was granted permission in 1995 to fly the Royal Australian Air Force Ensign and is the only school in Australia allowed to do so.

New Lambton once had an art deco cinema, The Savoy, now the New Lambton Community Centre.

Transport 
New Lambton is bordered by, or crossed by, various arterial roads. Lookout Road, which joins Croudace Road, borders the suburb to the west. To the east, Lambton Road facilitates access to the Newcastle central business district (CBD). To the south, Carnley Avenue and Northcott Drive provide access to the City of Lake Macquarie suburbs. The south-east of the suburb is bordered by the Main North Line, where the suburb is serviced by Adamstown railway station.

Blackbutt Reserve 

The entire south-western corner of the suburb is occupied by Blackbutt Reserve. Covering , the reserve is mainly urban bushland, and includes nature trails, wildlife exhibits, children's playgrounds and recreational facilities.

There are four main picnic and recreational areas in the reserve, off different entry points:
 Black Duck Picnic Area, located off Carnley Avenue;
 Richley Reserve Picnic Area, located off Freyberg Street, which was previously the site of the Buchanan Borehole Colliery;
 Dead Tree Picnic Area;
 and Lily Pond Picnic Area, off the corner of Queens Road and Mahogany Drive.

Sport 

New Lambton includes several parks where various sports are played. At the north-eastern corner of the suburb, is the Newcastle International Sports Centre, a venue used by the National Rugby League's Newcastle Knights and the A-League's Newcastle Jets. The suburb is also home to the New Lambton Football Club, the largest football club based on members in Northern NSW and they play games out of Alder Park and Novocastrian Park. New Lambton Football Club traces its origins back to 1896 when Scottish miners from South Lambton first played football, which became an official club in 1917 as returned servicemen came home from the Great War to again work in the mines.  Western Suburbs Rugby League and Cricket Club call Harker Oval home.

Education 
New Lambton Public is a government co-education primary located on Regent Street. Another government co-educational government school is located on 45 St James Street which is called New Lambton South Public School. There is also a Catholic co-educational primary called St Therese's Primary located on Burke Street.

References

External links 

 
 Images
 New Lambton Mechanics Institute
 Blackbutt Reserve's Lily Pond Picnic Area
 Blackbutt Reserve's Richley Reserve Picnic Area

Suburbs of Newcastle, New South Wales